Ugo Mattei (born 1961 in Turin, Piedmont) is the Alfred and Hanna Fromm Professor of International and Comparative Law at the University of California, Hastings College of the Law, in San Francisco, California, and a full professor of civil law in the University of Turin, Italy. He is the academic coordinator of the International University College of Turin, Italy, a school where issues of law and finance in global capitalism are critically approached. He is also a columnist for the Italian newspapers Il Manifesto and Il Fatto Quotidiano. For his ground-breaking studies on the commons, in 2017 Mattei won the Elinor Ostrom Award for the Collective Governance of the Commons.

Mattei graduated first in his class in 1983 from the Law School of the University of Turin and he received his LL.M. from Boalt Hall (University of California, Berkeley School of Law) in 1989 where he was a Fulbright Fellow. He also attended the London School of Economics and the Faculté Internationale de Droit Comparé in Strasbourg.

Mattei has been a visiting scholar at Yale Law School and the Trinity College and Wolfson College, University of Cambridge, and a visiting professor at Oslo, Berkeley, Montpellier, Macau. In 1985 he joined the law school of the University of Trento, where he received tenure as a full professor in 1990. In 1992 he was appointed as a professor in the Faculté Internationale de Droit Comparé (Strasbourg), where he served for four years.

In 1993, Mattei taught as a visiting professor on the U.C. Hastings faculty, where in 1994 he was appointed as the first holder of the Fromm Chair in International and Comparative Law, succeeding Rudolf Schlesinger in teaching comparative law. In 1997, he accepted a call from the University of Turin, Faculty of Law to succeed the famous Italian scholar Rodolfo Sacco in the Chair of Civil Law. He is a Full Member of the International Academy of Comparative Law, a member of the Executive Committee of the American Society of Comparative Law, a member of the Advisory Board of the Friburg Institute of Comparative Law, an advisor to the Institute of Law, Economics and Finances at Copenhagen Business School, a General Editor of the Series Common Core of European Private Law (Trento Project) at Cambridge University Press, a series editor of European Private Law in Context at Kluwer International and an editor in chief of Global Jurist. He is a member of the Editorial Board of the International Review of Law and Economics and of New Palgrave: A Dictionary of Economics and Law.

Mattei’s scholarship is broadly multi-disciplinary. Mattei has published many books and more than one hundred other publications in English, Italian, French, Portuguese, Russian, and Chinese. His book in English, written with anthropologist Laura Nader, Plunder: When the Rule of Law is Illegal. has been translated in five languages.

Ugo Mattei has recently oriented the focus of his research on the study and practice of the commons after successfully masterminding a nationwide referendum against privatization of water in 2011. His Italian bestseller "Beni Comuni.Un Manifesto" has generated much attention throughout European social movements. Mattei experimented some of the ideas developed in that book in Naples as the President of the local water company from 2012 to 2014 and in Chieri (Turin) as a Deputy Major in 2014 and 2015. In 2015 together with ecologist and scientist Fritjof Capra he has published "The Ecology of Law. Toward a Legal System in Tune with Nature and Community" that won IBPA Benjamin Franklin Award forPolitics/Current Events in 2016 and has since been translated to various languages. In 2018 with Alessandra Quarta he co-authored "The Turning Point in Private Law: Ecology, Technology and the Commons".

In 2018 Mattei has founded "Comitato Popolare Difesa beni pubblici e comuni Stefano Rodotà" (The Rodotà committee). The committee aims at creating the legal mechanisms to oppose the commodification of commons. Currently the committee is gathering signatures for the law of popular initiative on the commons and works on establishing the first inter-generational mutual aid society, Delfino.

On the 25th of April 2019, Ugo Mattei received Honoris Causa Doctorate by Faculty of Law and Criminology of Catholic University of Louvain.

Books

References

External links

Author's profile at Hastings
International University College of Turin
Elinor Ostrom Award

1961 births
Living people
Jurists from Turin
University of California, Hastings faculty
UC Berkeley School of Law alumni
Italian legal scholars
Alumni of the London School of Economics
Fellows of Trinity College, Cambridge
Fellows of Wolfson College, Cambridge
Law and economics scholars
University of Turin alumni
Scholars of comparative law